Association Al Mansoria, also called AS Mansouria, is a Moroccan football club currently playing in the third division.

References
 GNFA 1 Unofficial Website

Football clubs in Morocco
2000 establishments in Morocco
Sports clubs in Morocco